Ilse Meudtner (1 November 1912 – 18 July 1990) was a German diver. She competed at the 1928 Summer Olympics in the 3 m springboard and finished fourth.

Between 1934 and 1940 Meudtner was a solo dancer at the Berlin State Opera, and during World War II she performed abroad. After the war she married a Dutch man and became a Dutch citizen. An injury in 1955 ended her dancing career. Since 1964 she worked as a journalist in Madrid.

References

1912 births
1990 deaths
German female divers
Olympic divers of Germany
Divers at the 1928 Summer Olympics
20th-century German women